This list contains the transfers for the 2009–10 A-League season. It includes all transfers to an A-League club, but not players leaving A-League clubs. Promotions from youth squads to the first squad of the same club are also not included.

References

A-League Men transfers
Trans
Football transfers summer 2009
Football transfers winter 2009–10
Football transfers winter 2008–09